Gummow's Shop is a hamlet in the civil parish of St Newlyn East in mid Cornwall, England, UK. It is on the A3058 road southeast of Kestle Mill. Before 1938, there was a blacksmith in the building now known as "The Old Smithy". It is in the civil parish of Cubert

References

External links

Gummow's Shop, Cornwall; Francis Frith

Hamlets in Cornwall